Maryland House of Delegates District 1C is one of the 67 districts that compose the Maryland House of Delegates. Along with subdistricts 1A and 1B, it makes up the 1st district of the Maryland Senate. Situated in Western Maryland, District 1C covers parts of Allegany County and Washington County. Since 2023, it has been represented by Terry Baker, a Republican.

District 1C was created in the 1994 election, splitting off from District 1B, which until then had elected 2 delegates.

Demographic characteristics
As of the 2020 United States census, the district had a population of 39,382, of whom 31,702 (80.5%) were of voting age. The racial makeup of the district was 34,371 (87.3%) White, 2,157 (5.5%) African American, 92 (0.2%) Native American, 418 (1.1%) Asian, 3 (0.0%) Pacific Islander, 317 (0.8%) from some other race, and 2,010 (5.1%) from two or more races. Hispanic or Latino of any race were 914 (2.3%) of the population.

The district had 25,840 registered voters as of October 17, 2020, of whom 4,813 (18.6%) were registered as unaffiliated, 13,484 (52.2%) were registered as Republicans, 7,098 (27.5%) were registered as Democrats, and 238 (0.9%) were registered to other parties.

Past Election Results

1994

1998

2002

2006

2010

2014

2018

List of delegates

References

1C